Glazeley is a hamlet and civil parish in Shropshire, England.

It is situated on the B4363 road, southwest of  Bridgnorth.

There is a parish church in the hamlet. The civil parish is small and borders the even smaller parish of Deuxhill. The Borle Brook flows to the northeast of the hamlet, and Glazeley Bridge takes the B-road over this small river. The smaller Crunells Brook forms the southern boundary of the parish.

See also
Listed buildings in Glazeley

References

Civil parishes in Shropshire
Villages in Shropshire